Stroieşti may refer to several places in Romania:

Stroieşti, a commune in Suceava County
 Stroieşti, a village in Lunca Commune, Botoşani County
 Stroieşti, a village in Arcani Commune, Gorj County
 Stroieşti, a village in Tătărăni Commune, Vaslui County

and to:

Stroieşti, a commune in Transnistria, Moldova

See also 
 Stroe (disambiguation)
 Stroești (disambiguation)
 Strointsi (disambiguation)